Sigurd Jansen (born 4 March 1932) is a Norwegian composer, pianist and conductor.

Biography
Sigurd Alf Jansen was born in Horten, in Vestfold county, Norway. He studied classical music at the Norwegian Academy of Music in Oslo. He was a teacher of piano from 1957 to 1962.  Jansen has worked as an orchestra leader at Chat Noir, and as jazz pianist, orchestra leader and arranger on a number of recordings. Since 1957 he has worked in the Norwegian Broadcasting Corporation where he is responsible for the music of a variety of TV programs and movies. His main occupation is to compose, arrange, conduct and play piano.

Sigurd Jansen is also a composer and has won several awards for his compositions. In 1964 Jansen won the Norwegian final of the Eurovision Song Contest with Spiral, with text by Egil Hagen (1912- 2004), performed by Arne Bendiksen. He has composed music for  several movies.  Jansen was also consultant for the Norwegian pavilion in  EPCOT Center at Walt Disney World.

Conductor
Internationally, he has served as conductor for his own compositions and arrangements with, among others, the following:

 Malmö Symphony Orchestra
 Bergen Philharmonic Orchestra
 BBC Symphony Orchestra
 Metropol Orchestra in the Netherlands
 Danish National Symphony Orchestra
 Symphony Orchestra in Hannover

Sigurd Jansen was the conductor of six Norwegian entries in Eurovision Song Contest between 1979 and 1984.
Oliver (1979)
 Sámiid Ædnan (1980)
 Aldri i livet (1981)
 Adieu (1982)
 Do Re Mi (1983)
 Lenge Leve Livet (1984)

Films
He wrote the score of these films:
 1972: Takt og tone i himmelsengen (Danish)
 1967: Elsk...din næste (Danish)
 1965: De kalte ham Skarven (Norwegian)

Awards
Jansen has received a number of  awards:
 Spellemannprisen (Norwegian Grammy Award) - 1972
 Nordring Award for Best Music Producer - 1973
 Nordring Award for Best Music Arranger - 1975

References

External links
 Biography in Norsk pop- og rockleksikon
 Biography em Mic

1932 births
Living people
Musicians from Horten
Norwegian classical composers
Norwegian classical musicians
Norwegian conductors (music)
Male conductors (music)
NRK people
Eurovision Song Contest conductors
Spellemannprisen winners
Norwegian male classical composers
21st-century conductors (music)
21st-century Norwegian male musicians